ClassPass Inc. is the largest health club aggregator by number of club partnerships, with over 30,000 health clubs in 28 countries. For a subscription fee, it provides both online and in-person access to different fitness classes such as yoga, strength training, barre, martial arts, pilates, boxing, and indoor cycling classes, as well as use of health clubs. It has locations in the United States, Australia, Brazil, Canada, Europe, New Zealand, India, Thailand, Singapore, Spain, United Arab Emirates, Hong Kong, Indonesia, and Malaysia. It is a subsidiary of Mindbody Inc.

History
In 2011, after spending over an hour searching online for an open ballet class in New York City, 28-year old Payal Kadakia, an Indian American graduate of the Massachusetts Institute of Technology and employee of Warner Music Group, realized she was tired of corporate life and allocated herself fourteen days to come up with an idea for her own company. During this time, she had the idea to create a search engine and reservation system for fitness classes. In September 2012, Mary Biggins was hired. In June 2012, Kadakia and  Sanjiv Sanghavi released Classtivity to the public. In January 2014, Classtivity was rebranded as ClassPass. Sanghavi left in January 2014.

An earlier version of the company's product was intended to sell a better registration system to fitness studios but this did not receive much interest. After participating in the TechStars accelerator, the company switched to offering a package deal where users could pay $49 for 10 classes in a year, a model that Kadakia likened to Groupon. However, users of the service wanted to take more than 10 classes per year, so the company switched to offering a 10-class subscription service for $99 per month. The company enforces a cancellation fee of $20 for missing classes.

By April 2016, the company had booked over 17 million fitness reservations. The company also added additional pricing tiers such as 3 or 5 classes per month.

In March 2017, Payal Kadakia swapped roles with Fritz Lanman, with Lanman becoming CEO and Kadakia becoming Executive Chairman.

By June 2017, the company had booked 35 million reservations  and by December 2017, the company had booked 45 million reservations.

In August 2017, the company announced its expansion to New Orleans, Pittsburgh, San Antonio, Cincinnati, Calgary, Honolulu, Indianapolis, Milwaukee, Riverside, California, and Salt Lake City.

In 2017, the company was ranked #2 on the Deloitte Fast 500 North America list.

In March 2018, ClassPass launched live-streamed fitness classes for $15 per month.

In October 2018, ClassPass was launched in Thailand.

In January 2019, Classpass acquired Guavapass.

In April 2020, during the COVID-19 pandemic, the company laid off 53% of its 700 employees.

Financing
ClassPass received seed funding of $2 million in March 2014, then attracted $12 million in Series A round funding from entrepreneur Fritz Lanman in September 2014. In 2015, it received $40 million of Series B funding from General Catalyst and Thrive Capital. The company was valued as over $200 million. Classpass received an additional $30 million of funding in November 2015 led by Google Ventures. ClassPass announced a $70 million Series C led by Temasek Holdings in May 2017 that valued the company at $470 million. In July 2018, it raised US$85M in financing led by Temasek to expand into Asia. In January 2020, it raised $285 million in funding at a $1 billion valuation. In October 2021, the company was acquired by Mindbody Inc.

Criticism
ClassPass has been criticized for undercutting the business model of the health clubs that it relies on, with a 2015 article in The New York Times describing it as a "middleman" between consumers and health clubs, and arguing that a "power imbalance" exists between the health clubs' owners and ClassPass which mirrors the relationship with other digital intermediary services such as Amazon.com and Uber. The service has accounted for lower margins at some gyms where owners limit the number of members "to prevent being cannibalized".

See also
 Indians in the New York City metropolitan region
 Tech companies in the New York metropolitan area

References

External links
 

2013 establishments in New York City
Companies based in New York City
Health clubs
Online companies of the United States
Privately held companies of the United States
Subscription services